Channel 83 was removed from television use in 1987. [4] The highest frequency to have been used for NTSC-M terrestrial TV broadcasting, it was formerly used by a handful of television stations in North America which broadcast on 884-890 MHz. In the United States, channels 7083 served primarily as a "translator band" for low-power repeater transmitters filling gaps in coverage for existing stations. Many are defunct, with the few still in existence now moved to lower frequencies:
 CFQC-TV (CTV Saskatoon) rebroadcaster CFQC-TV-3 Richmond Lake, Saskatchewan is no longer on the air.
 KARE (NBC Minneapolis) rebroadcaster K83AE Redwood Falls, Minnesota moved to K68BJ channel 68.
 KLBK-TV (CBS Lubbock) rebroadcaster K83AQ Matador, Texas moved to K47GE channel 47.
 KHQ-TV (NBC Spokane) rebroadcaster K83AJ Quincy, Washington moved to K48BY channel 48
 KOAT-TV (ABC Albuquerque) rebroadcasters K83BK Carrizozo, New Mexico moved to K43BT channel 43 and K83BL Montoya-Newkirk moved to K57BR channel 57.
 KPNX (NBC Phoenix) rebroadcaster K83AC Globe, Arizona moved to K61FB channel 61.
 KRDO-TV (ABC Colorado Springs) rebroadcaster K83BP Deora, Colorado moved to K49BT channel 49.
 KRQE (CBS Albuquerque) rebroadcaster K83AB Santa Rosa, New Mexico moved to K38HR channel 38.
 KSAT-TV (ABC San Antonio) rebroadcaster K83BO Uvalde, Texas moved to K65EQ channel 65.
 KSL-TV (CBS Salt Lake City) rebroadcaster K83AF Delta, Utah moved to K39FR channel 39.
 KTTC (NBC Rochester, Minnesota) rebroadcaster W83AH La Crosse, Wisconsin moved to W67CH channel 67 (now W34FC-D, channel 34).
 KUED-TV (PBS Salt Lake City) rebroadcasters K83BB Duchesne, Utah moved to K03CN channel 3, K83BD Marysvale, Utah moved to K46FX channel 46 and K83BC Virgin, Utah moved to K25HB channel 25.
 WXXW-TV (later WYCC PBS Chicago) had used a small channel 83 rebroadcaster from 1965-1972. The main channel 20 transmitter moved to the Sears Tower once that building was completed in May 1973, rendering the fill-in repeater signal unnecessary.
 A RadioShack device, the Multiple Video Distribution System (15-1284 or 150-1284), was marketed in the mid 1980s with the capability of block conversion of up to three independent RF modulator signals from VHF channel 3/4 for home viewing on any of channels 74/75, 78/79 and/or 82/83 - channels which remained unused in most markets. Later versions of the product were forced to lower frequencies by the removal of UHF channels 70-83 from television receivers in 1987.

References 
4. https://www.youtube.com/watch?v=ahtRI-_A1j8
83